Route 407, also known as St. Andrew's-Searston Road, is a minor highway on the western portion of Newfoundland in the Canadian province of Newfoundland and Labrador.  The route's southern terminus is the Trans-Canada Highway (Route 1) in the community of Tompkins, and its northern terminus is in the community of Millville, at an intersection with Route 406 (Codroy Road).  Along with Route 406, Route 407 allows for an extensive view of the Codroy Valley.

Route description

Route 407 begins at an intersection with Route 1 (Trans-Canada Highway) and heads southwest along the banks of the Little Codroy River to pass through St. Andrew's, where it makes a sharp right turn at an intersection with a local road leading to the St. Andrews (Codroy Valley) Airport. The highway passes northwest through farmland to have an intersection with a local road leading to Loch Lomond before passing through Searston. Route 407 now crosses the mouth of the Codroy River and passes through Codroy Valley Provincial Park before entering Millville and coming to an end at an intersection with Route 406 (Codroy Road).

Major intersections

Attractions along Route 407

Codroy Valley Provincial Park

References

407